Nupserha clypealis is a species of beetle in the family Cerambycidae. It was described by Léon Fairmaire in 1895.

Subspecies
 Nupserha clypealis formosana Breuning, 1960
 Nupserha clypealis clypealis (Fairmaire, 1895)

References

clypealis
Beetles described in 1895